Pioraco is a comune (municipality) in the Province of Macerata in the Italian region Marche, located about  southwest of Ancona and about  southwest of Macerata.

History

The territory of Pioraco was settled in the Neolithic Age, as shown by the remains of a Bronze Age sanctuary on the top of Monte Primo (late 11th-early 10th centuries BC). In Roman times, Pioraco was a settlement on a branch of the Via Flaminia, with bridges, temples, public edifices and an aqueduct.

In the Middle Ages, it housed a castle which was a residence of the Da Varano family, lords of the nearby Camerino. The presence of paper mills, still active today, is attested from 1346.

Main sights
San Vittorino: Pieve or parish church with baptistry, documented from 1119, built atop the remains of a Roman temple, using spolia. It houses frescoes and baptismal font from 1646.
San Francesco: a Romanesque-style church completed in 1327, with a polygonal apse. The interior was remade in Baroque style: it houses an Annunciation attributed to Arcangelo di Cola and a Via Crucis  by Francesco Mancini. The annexed convent has a frescoed cloister.
Santissimo Crocifisso: a church built in Lombard-Gothic style. It is home to a Crucifix attributed to Girolamo di Giovanni.
Madonna della Grotta: small 18th-century chapel/church built in a niche in the rocks, used as hermitage. It has a 15th-century wooden statue of the "Madonna with Child".
Roman Bridge.

References

Cities and towns in the Marche